Sir Peter John Westmacott  (born 23 December 1950) is a senior British diplomat, who was British Ambassador to Turkey, then Ambassador to France (2007 to 2011) and finally Ambassador to the United States from January 2012 to January 2016, succeeding Sir Nigel Sheinwald, a posting announced by the Prime Minister's Office on 24 June 2011.

Career 

Westmacott joined the Foreign and Commonwealth Office in 1972, and his first overseas posting was as Second Secretary at Tehran, Iran, in 1974. In 1978, he was sent to the European Commission in Brussels, and from 1980 to 1984 he was in Paris. After a period in London he was in Ankara as Head of Chancery from 1987.

In 1990, he was Deputy Private Secretary to the Prince of Wales, and in 1993 was sent to Washington to serve as a Counsellor. Later postings included Director for the Americas in the Foreign and Commonwealth Office, and Deputy Under Secretary of State.

From 2002 to 2006, Westmacott was HM Ambassador to Turkey.

Formerly HM Ambassador to France since 2007, Westmacott took over as HM Ambassador to the United States in January 2012. In 2015, Westmacott was paid a salary of between £170,000 and £174,999 by the Foreign Office, making him one of the 328 most highly paid people in the British public sector at that time.

Personal life 
Westmacott was educated at Taunton School before going to New College, Oxford. In 1972, Westmacott married Angela Lugg, with whom he had two sons and a daughter. In 2001, he married Susan Nemazee.

Westmacott's father was Ian Westmacott, a reverend, and his mother was named Rosemary (née Watney). His cousin, Captain Herbert Westmacott MC, was killed during a gunfight with the Provisional Irish Republican Army in Belfast in 1980.

Honours and awards
  Knight Grand Cross of the Order of St Michael and St George (GCMG) – 2016
  Lieutenant of the Royal Victorian Order (LVO) – 1993
  Commandeur, Legion of Honour – 2008

In March 1993 Westmacott was appointed a Lieutenant of the Royal Victorian Order. He was later appointed a Companion of the Order of St Michael and St George in the 2000 New Year Honours before being promoted to Knight Commander (KCMG) in the 2003 Birthday Honours and Knight Grand Cross (GCMG) in the 2016 Birthday Honours for services to diplomacy.

References

External links
 Debrett's People of Today

 

1950 births
Living people
Alumni of New College, Oxford
Ambassadors of the United Kingdom to Turkey
Ambassadors of the United Kingdom to France
Ambassadors of the United Kingdom to the United States
Commandeurs of the Légion d'honneur
Knights Grand Cross of the Order of St Michael and St George
Lieutenants of the Royal Victorian Order
Members of the Household of the Prince of Wales
People educated at Taunton School